Louis Eugene Bevil (born Bevilacqua; November 27, 1922 – February 1, 1973) was an American professional baseball player.

Bevil's professional career began in 1940 and he was recalled to Washington after completing three minor-league seasons. At the age of 19, Bevil was the second-youngest player in the American League in 1942. In his debut, he was the starting pitcher against the Chicago White Sox on September 2 at Griffith Stadium. But he registered only one out, and permitted four runs on four hits and one base on balls before being relieved by Bill Zuber. Bevil was charged with the eventual 7–6 defeat, his only MLB pitching decision.  He appeared in three more games, all in relief, before the end of the 1942 campaign. He then joined the United States Army for World War II military service.

He returned to professional baseball, but not the major leagues, in 1946. During his four-game stint with Washington in 1942, Bevil allowed nine hits and 11 bases on balls in 9 innings pitched, posting an earned run average of 6.52. He was credited with two strikeouts. He played in the minors through 1950, where he won 100 games. He also was a player-manager for all or parts of three minor-league seasons.

Bevil died at age 50 in Dixon, Illinois.

References

External links

1922 births
1973 deaths
United States Army personnel of World War II
Anniston Rams players
Baseball players from Illinois
Chattanooga Lookouts players
Daytona Beach Islanders players
DeLand Red Hats players
Major League Baseball pitchers
Minor league baseball managers
Notre Dame Fighting Irish baseball players
Orlando Senators players
People from Lee County, Illinois
Thomasville Lookouts players
University of Notre Dame alumni
Washington Senators (1901–1960) players